Black Man may refer to:

Black people
Black Man (novel), a 2007 novel by Richard Morgan
Black Man (song), a 1976 song by Stevie Wonder
Black Man (wrestler), a Mexican wrestler
Bogeyman, a mythical creature known as the Black Man in some countries
A German tag game; see

See also 
 Blackman, a surname
 Black Woman (disambiguation)
 Dark Man (disambiguation)